Paul D. Austerberry is a Canadian  film and television production designer of English and Filipino descent. Mr. Austerberry is notably recognized for his architectural engineering in  cinematic set design for the 2017 film The Shape of Water ( FOX Searchlight Pictures), for which he won an Academy Award and a BAFTA Award for Best Production Design with set decorators Shane Vieau and Jeff Melvin, and the 2013 film Pompeii, for which he won the Canadian Screen Award for Best Art Direction/Production Design at the 3rd Canadian Screen Awards in 2015 with Nigel Churcher.

Early life and Background 
Paul Austerberry was born in 1966 to parents Peter and Deanna Austerberry. Though the City of Toronto is his birthplace, Northern Ontario's Sault Ste. Marie waterfront city is the place where Paul Austerberry, an only child, was raised  by his British-born father and Filipina mother.

Education 
Austerberry graduated from Carleton University in 1989 with a Bachelor of Architecture.

Filmography

References

External links 
 

1966 births
Living people
Best Art Direction Academy Award winners
Best Production Design BAFTA Award winners
Canadian production designers
Canadian people of English descent
Canadian people of Filipino descent
Best Art Direction/Production Design Genie and Canadian Screen Award winners
Carleton University alumni